Penticton is a provincial electoral district in British Columbia, Canada, established by the Electoral Districts Act, 2008. Previously the district was  named Penticton-Okanagan Valley from 2001 to 2009 and Okanagan-Penticton from 1991 to 2001. It was contested for the first time in its current for in the 2009 general election.

Geography
As of the 2020 provincial election, Penticton comprises the northeastern portion of the Regional District of Okanagan-Similkameen and the southwestern portion of the Regional District of Central Okanagan. It is located in southern British Columbia. Communities in the electoral district consist of Penticton, Summerland, and Peachland.

History 
Okanagan-Penticton was created for the 1991 election from parts of the dual member ridings of Boundary-Similkameen and Okanagan South.

1999 Redistribution
From Okanagan-Penticton and the western portion of Okanagan-Boundary to Penticton-Okanagan Valley

Members of the Legislative Assembly

Electoral history

Penticton

|-

|}

Penticton-Okanagan Valley

|-

|-
 
|NDP
|Garry Litke
|align="right"|10,197
|align="right"|37.52%
|align="right"|
|align="right"|$33,019

|Independent
|Jane Turnell
|align="right"|660
|align="right"|2.43%
|align="right"|
|align="right"|$282

|}

 
|NDP
|Naga Terada
|align="right"|3,887
|align="right"|15.62%
|align="right"|$8,128

|}

Okanagan-Penticton

References

British Columbia provincial electoral districts
Penticton